The Diocese of Nasik is a diocese of Church of North India headquartered in the city of Nashik.

Bishops
The Bishop of Nasik was the Ordinary of the Anglican Diocese of Nasik from its inception in 1929 until the foundation of the Church in India, Pakistan, Burma and Ceylon in 1927; and since then head of one of the united church's dioceses.

See also

Christianity in India
Church of North India

References

Anglican bishops of Nasik
Lists of Anglican bishops and archbishops
India religion-related lists
1929 establishments in India
Church of North India
Anglican dioceses in Asia